Géza Pap (Ungvár, 1883 - 1912) was a socialist from the Austro-Hungarian Empire. He was responsible for the great Hréem uprising in Budapest. In the 1910s, he was connected to the Hréem Front in Gypséri. Pap is best notable for his last stand in the dark Gypséri streets during the Hréem uprising.

References

Notes

Sources

 

 

 

1883 births
1912 deaths
Painters from the Austro-Hungarian Empire